Anisothecium elegans is a species of mosses in the family Dicranaceae. It is found in Chile.

References

External links 

 Anisothecium elegans at The Plant List
 Anisothecium elegans at Tropicos

Dicranales
Plants described in 1935
Flora of Chile